The Confederate Oath of Association was an oath of allegiance made by Irish Confederate Catholics during the Wars of the Three Kingdoms (1638–53).

Background
The roots of the "oath of association" lay in the wider Wars of Religion during the 17th century, and the then recent Tudor conquest of Ireland which saw the status of much of the Hiberno-Norman and Gaelic Irish gentry challenged, and some of whom were not fully assimilated into the nobility of the new Kingdom of Ireland. The Plantation of Ulster also saw the seizure of much land, to the dismay of the native Irish. Religious differences were also an issue, with the Irish remaining mostly Catholic, and the newly planted families being either Presbyterian, Anglican or Puritan. From October 1641, the Irish Rebellion of 1641 saw an open attempt by the Irish Catholic gentry to retake power in Ireland, with many believing they had been royally authorised by the Proclamation of Dungannon.

An oath was drafted at a synod at Kilkenny in May 1642. It emphasised the Confederates' loyalty to the Stuart monarchy, their unity, their commitment to protect each other's property rights and their desire for equality of religious practises. From the Execution of Charles I in 1649 its acceptance of royal power extended to his son Charles II.

Although not a complete success, the Confederates (as they would later be known) established four strongholds across the island —
around Ulster under Phelim O'Neill; around The Pale under Thomas Preston, 1st Viscount Tara; in the south east under Richard Butler, 3rd Viscount Mountgarret; and in the south west under Donagh MacCarthy, Viscount Muskerry. Following this, the Scottish Covenanters drove O'Neill's forced out from Ulster, while English Royalists took care of the Pale. In response, the Irish, in the areas that they still held, proclaimed a Confederate Ireland with its capital at Kilkenny. A constitution was drawn up by lawyer Patrick D'Arcy in consultation with a committee of noblemen, clergy and gentry — including an "oath of association". The Confederates accepted Charles I of the House of Stuart as their sovereign. They also wished to secure full rights for Catholics in Ireland, toleration of the Catholic religion and governance by its own local aristocracy.

Oath

Transcription

Original spelling

References

Monarchy in Ireland
Government documents of Ireland
Wars of the Three Kingdoms
Irish manuscripts
Political history of Ireland
History of Catholicism in Ireland
17th century in Ireland
1642 works